The sixth generation of the BMW 5 Series consists of the BMW F10 (sedan version), BMW F11 (wagon version, marketed as Touring) and BMW F07 (fastback version, marketed as Gran Turismo) executive cars and were produced by BMW from January 2010 (for the 2011 model year) to 2017, with F10 being launched on 20 March 2010 to domestic market and F11 in the summer of 2010. The F07 Gran Turismo was produced from early September 2009 to 2017, being launched in the domestic German market in late October 2009.

The Gran Turismo version is the first and only 5 Series to be produced in a fastback body style. The F10 generation is also the first 5 Series to offer a hybrid drivetrain, a turbocharged V8 engine, an 8-speed automatic transmission, a dual-clutch transmission (in the M5), active rear-wheel steering (called "Integral Active Steering"), electric power steering, double-wishbone front suspension, an LCD instrument cluster (called "Black Panel Display") and automatic parking (called "Parking Assistant"). A long-wheelbase sedan version (model code F18) was sold in China, Mexico and the Middle East.

The M5 model, introduced in 2011, is powered by the BMW S63 twin-turbocharged V8 engine coupled to a 7-speed dual clutch transmission. It is the first M5 to use a turbocharged engine.

In February 2017, the G30 5 Series was released as the successor to the F10.

Development 
From November 2005 to December 2006, the exterior was designed by Jacek Fröhlich under the leadership of BMW Group Design Director Adrian van Hooydonk. The Touring version was designed by Jean-Francois Alexandre Huet. While the Gran Turismo version was designed by Christopher Weil.

The F10 was unveiled in Munich on 23 November 2009.

Body styles

Sedan (F10) 
The sedan was the second body style to be launched. It was unveiled at the Munich Olympic Stadium on November 23, 2009 and production began in January 2010.

Touring (F11) 
The Touring model was unveiled at the 2010 Leipzig Auto Show and production began in January 2010.

Gran Turismo (F07) 
The 5 Series Gran Turismo is a 5-door fastback body style which began production in September 2009. The tailgate has a unique two-way opening mechanism, which may be opened in a traditional car-like fashion, or the entire hatch may be open in a traditional SUV fashion for larger objects. The 5 Series GT features frameless doors, which is a first for a four-door BMW model.

Although sold as part of the 5 Series range, is suggested that the Gran Turismo chassis has more in common with the F01 7 Series, Due to its tall proportions, the F07 has been described as a "7 Series hatchback". When combined with the raised roofline, this results in more passenger and luggage space than the E61 5 Series wagon/estate and similar headroom to the E70 X5 and F01 7 Series. All F07 models use an 8-speed automatic transmission.

The 5 Series GT was introduced as the BMW Concept 5 Series Gran Turismo at the 2009 Geneva Motor Show and the production version was unveiled at the 2009 International Motor Show Germany in Frankfurt and sales began in the fourth quarter of 2009. In most countries, the 5 Series GT was sold along with previous generation E60/E61 5 Series sedan and wagon/estate models, therefore the 5 Series GT was the first model of the F10/F11/F07 generation to be launched. The F07 535i GT was the first model to use the N55 turbocharged straight-six engine, which replaced the N54. Sales of all-wheel drive ("xDrive") models began in June 2010.

For the following G30 generation, the Gran Turismo models were moved to the 6 Series model range and renamed the G32 6 Series Gran Turismo.

Long wheelbase sedan (F18) 
A long wheelbase (LWB) version of the BMW 5 Series Sedan was developed for the Chinese market, as a lower cost alternative to the 7 Series.

The F18 was assembled at BMW Plant Shenyang in Shenyang.

Styling 
The F10 uses a more traditional BMW exterior styling approach compared with the controversial styling of its E60 5 Series predecessor. The "Bangle butt" is removed, a Hofmeister kink is present, a traditional kidney grill is used and crease lines are used on the bonnet (similar to the E39 5 Series and earlier generations). Reviews of the styling have ranged from slightly bland, to handsome and muscular.

Equipment 

The interior features an updated iDrive system and a  increase in rear knee-room for rear passengers. The F10 saw the return of the centre console being angled towards the driver, as used on the 5 Series from 1981 to 2003.

The equipment available on the F10 includes regenerative braking, a driving mode selector ("Dynamic Drive Control" with Comfort, Normal, Sport and Sport+ modes, an 80 GB hard disc for navigation data and music storage,
Head-Up Display, radar cruise control which can completely stop the car and accelerate from a standstill ("Active Cruise Control with Stop and Go"), blind spot monitoring, lane departure warning system, night vision rear-wheel steering ("Integral Active Steering"), side-facing cameras in the front bumper ("Sideview"), a virtual overhead graphic of the car to assist with parking ("Topview") and speed limit display, which uses a camera to recognise street signs and display the speed limit.

The full set of M Performance parts can be fitted to all Models with the M sport trim. These include blacked out grilles, a carbon fibre splitter, spoiler for touring models, carbon fibre mirrors, side skirts only for M Sport models and an M Performance silencer for 535i models.

Engines

Petrol 
The factory ratings are as follows:

In Europe, the naturally aspirated six-cylinder models used the direct-injection BMW N53 engine, however many countries outside Europe continued to use the older BMW N52 engine instead, due to high sulfur levels in the locally available petrol.

Diesel 
The factory ratings are as follows:

North American 535d models used the  engine from the European-specification 530d models.

Drivetrain 
Transmission options for the model range (excluding the M5) were a 6-speed manual or an 8-speed ZF 8HP automatic. The M5 uses a 7-speed dual clutch transmission (with a 6-speed manual also being available in the United States and Canada).

Chassis and suspension 
The F10 uses the same platform as the F01 7 Series. Front suspension is double wishbone with double-pivot lower arms (previous 5 Series generations used Macpherson struts). Rear suspension is a multi-link design with 5 links called "Integral V".

Most suspension components are made from aluminium. The chassis is constructed from various grades of steel and the body is 55% stiffer than its E60 predecessor. Compared with the aluminium front structure used by the E60, the F10's steel components are heavier but cheaper to produce and repair. To reduce weight, the bonnet, front fenders and doors are made from aluminium.

The rear-wheel drive version of the 2011 535i has a rollover risk of 9.3% and a 5 of 5 stars overall safety rating.

M5 model 

The official  time is 4.4 seconds.

A seven-speed dual-clutch transmission ("M-DCT") is used, along with a limited slip differential that can provide torque vectoring between the rear wheels. In North America, the M5 was available with a 6-speed manual transmission, the only market to be offered this option.

Alpina models 

Alpina produced two variants of the F10/F11 5 Series, the petrol-engined B5 and diesel-engined D5.

 B5 Bi-Turbo

The B5 is based on the 550i and is powered by an Alpina-modified version of the BMW N63 twin-turbo V8 engine. The transmission is an 8-speed automatic.

Alpina unveiled an updated B5 at the 2012 Geneva Motor Show. During 2015, Alpina sold the B5 Bi-Turbo Edition 50, which marked the company's 50th year in operation. The standard B5 received this same engine for the B5's last year of production, 2016.

 D5 Bi-Turbo
The D5 Bi-Turbo is based on the 535d.

Special models

530Le (China only) 

The 530Le is a plug-in hybrid version F18 long-wheelbase sedan, which was produced solely for the Chinese market.

It was unveiled at the 2014 Guangzhou Auto Show.

ActiveHybrid 5 

The ActiveHybrid is a hybrid version of the 5 Series based on the 535i Sedan. It was previewed by the Concept 5 Series ActiveHybrid at the 2010 Geneva Motor Show and produced from 2011 to 2016.

The production ActiveHybrid 5 features a synchronous electric motor integrated into the housing of the automatic gearbox. This is combined with the turbocharged 3.0 litre straight-six engine from the 535i. The lithium-ion battery has its own cooling system and has a capacity of 1.35 kWh. Due to the presence of the battery, luggage space is reduced from 520 litres to 375 litres.

The ActiveHybrid 5 includes a start-stop system and a coasting mode.

The fuel-saving technologies reduces fuel consumption and emissions by more than 10%.

M550d xDrive 

The M550d xDrive is the highest diesel-engined model, and was produced in sedan and Touring body styles. It was a launch model for the "M Performance" sub-brand – alongside the X5 M50d and X6 M50d – at the 2012 Geneva International Motor Show and was produced until 2016. The M550d is powered by the N57S triple-turbo straight-6 diesel engine. The transmission is a ZF 8HP 8-speed automatic and all models are all-wheel drive ("xDrive").

Model year changes

2012 
 520i model introduced, the second 5 Series to be powered by a four-cylinder turbocharged petrol engine.
 ActiveHybrid 5 introduced, the first hybrid-powered 5 Series.
 "BMW ConnectedDrive" introduced, including an upgraded Head-Up Display, Real-Time Traffic Information and hands-free opening of the tailgate or rear window.

2014 facelift 
The F10 facelift (also known as LCI) models began production in July 2013. Changes include:
 518d model introduced
 550i engine upgraded to N63B44O2, increasing power to 
 Bi-Xenon headlights with washers fitted as standard, revised tail-lights, optional LED and or adaptive headlights and fog lights as options
 Improved Stop/Start system
 Improved auto transmission features (coasting in idle, connected shift)
 Improved and additional driver assistance systems
 Improved electronic handbrake
 Tablets available for rear seat passengers
 Minor exterior styling changes.
 Turn signal repeater integrated into wing mirrors
 Upgraded iDrive with touchpad added to the top of the iDrive controller
 Gran Turismo models use a revised tailgate and have an increase in luggage capacity by

Production 
Production of the F10 occurred at the BMW Group Plant Dingolfing in Germany and at the BMW Brilliance plant in China. Series production began on 7 January 2010 and the last F10 generation car was produced in February 2017.

Complete knock-down assembly of German-produced kits took place in Thailand, Malaysia, Egypt,
India, Indonesia and Russia.

Safety
The 2010 530d received five stars overall in its Euro NCAP test.

Marketing 

In 2011, BMW North America released an advertisement called "Refuel" to promote the F10's fuel economy and re-introduce BMW's traditional "Ultimate Driving Machine" motto. The ad features an F10 sedan and a jet plane.

BMW Canada's advertisement for the launch of the F10 M5 in 2012 is a 2-minute video called "Bullet". The advertisement shows the M5 launching from a tube and destroying several targets in its path. In December 2011, the F10 M5 featured in a commercial where an illustrator attempted to draw a Christmas card in the M5 while it was being driven around the Circuit de l'Anneau Du Rhin. A movie featuring an M5 prototype driving in snow was also produced.

The F10 M5 was also used as a Nürburgring Ring Taxi. It was unveiled at the 2011 Goodwood Festival of Speed and replaced the E90 M3 as Ring Taxi in April 2012.

References

F10
5 Series
Euro NCAP executive cars
Sedans
Station wagons
Cars introduced in 2010